Mitrasen Yadav (11 July 1934 – 7 September 2015) was an Indian politician affiliated with the Samajwadi Party.

Career
Mitrasen joined politics as a member of the Communist Party of India in 1966. He was one of the accused in 16 criminal cases including 6 cases of attempt to murder and 3 cases of dacoity, according to his affidavit at the time on nomination.

In 1977, Mitrasen Yadav was elected to the Uttar Pradesh Vidhan Sabha from Milkipur constituency as a Communist Party of India candidate. He was re-elected to the Uttar Pradesh Vidhan Sabha in 1977, 1980, 1985 and in 2012 from Bikapur.

Mitrasen Yadav was elected to the 9th Lok Sabha from Faizabad constituency as a CPI candidate in 1991. On 4 March 1995, he joined Samajwadi Party (SP). In 1998, he was elected to the 12th Lok Sabha as a Samajwadi Party candidate from the same constituency. In 2004, Mitrasen again joined the BSP, and was elected to the 14th Lok Sabha. In 2009, he again joined the SP.

Positions held

Death
Mitrasen Yadav died on the morning of September 7, 2015.

References

1934 births
2015 deaths
Samajwadi Party politicians
People from Uttar Pradesh
People from Faizabad
India MPs 2004–2009
India MPs 1989–1991
India MPs 1998–1999
Uttar Pradesh MLAs 2012–2017
Lok Sabha members from Uttar Pradesh
Communist Party of India politicians from Uttar Pradesh
Bahujan Samaj Party politicians from Uttar Pradesh